The UCI Urban Cycling World Championships are the world championship events for freestyle BMX, cross-country eliminator, and trials. They are organised by the Union Cycliste Internationale (UCI), the governing body of world cycling.

History
The first three finishers in each discipline are awarded gold, silver, and bronze medals. The winner of each discipline is also entitled to wear the rainbow jersey in events of that discipline until the following year's World Championships.

The UCI Urban Cycling World Championships were held for the first time in 2017. The UCI World Championships in cross-country eliminator and trials were previously held as part of the UCI Mountain Bike & Trials World Championships. Freestyle BMX received UCI World Cup status in 2016 and the UCI did not previously crown a world champion in the discipline.

The first three editions of the Urban Cycling World Championships are scheduled to be held in China.

Venues

Events

UCI Urban Cycling World Champions
 Men's cross-country eliminator
 Women's cross-country eliminator
 Men's trials, 20 inch
 Men's trials, 26 inch
 Women's trials

References

External links

 Event web page
 UCI freestyle BMX page
 UCI mountain bike page
 UCI trials page

 
Mountain biking events
BMX competitions
Urban Cycling
Recurring sporting events established in 2017